Thomas Michael Quinn (April 28, 1934 in Queens, New York – January 5, 2014 in Teaneck, New Jersey) was an American actor who appeared in numerous small roles on television and in various films, including a stint as Detective Patrick Mahon on HBO's The Wire.

Quinn had small roles in the films Major League II and Super 8, as well as an episode of The West Wing. He portrayed Coach Bell in The Hammer.

Quinn died in 2014 at age 79 from complications of diabetes.

Filmography

References

External links

2014 deaths
1934 births
American male film actors
American male television actors
People from Queens, New York
Male actors from New York City
20th-century American male actors
21st-century American male actors
Deaths from diabetes